Pencil Box is a children's television programme broadcast by CBC Television from 1976 to 1979.  The programme comprised stories written by Ottawa students, mostly aged 8 to 12, and incorporated various story-telling devices, such as mime, puppets, masks, and animation.  Colour-separation overlay was used to place live actors in front of cutout sets.

Recurring characters in the show were
 Bolo Bat
 Stubby Pencil
 Miffy Skunk
 Clara Cactus

The show won an ACTRA Award for Best Children's Television Show at the 9th ACTRA Awards in 1979.

References

External links 
 

1970s Canadian children's television series
CBC Television original programming
1976 Canadian television series debuts
Canadian television series with live action and animation
Canadian television shows featuring puppetry
1979 Canadian television series endings